Nabanna may refer to–

 Nabanna,  a Bengali harvest celebration usually celebrated with food and dance and music
 Nabanna (play), a Bengali language play written by Bijon Bhattacharya and staged by Indian People's Theatre Association (1944) under the direction of Sombhu Mitra and Bohurupee (1948) under the direction of Kumar Roy
 Nabanna (building), a building in Howrah which houses the temporary State Secretariat of West Bengal.